Stacked is a 2008 British television series pilot episode directed by Jennifer Perrott and written and created by Bryony Ive as her first drama commission, and the first drama film to be created through 4Talent Scotland's television pilot competition. The film stars Karen Gillan, Rebecca Reid, and Eleanor Bird.

Synopsis
Stacked follows the adventures of three teenage sisters, Ginny (Karen Gillan), Tallulah (Rebecca Reid) and Shona Turner (Eleanor Bird), and their passage into the world of fashion. Their father (Mark Bazeley) is the writer of a popular men's magazine, Stacked.

Cast
 Mark Bazeley as Jamie Turner
 Eleanor Bird as Shona Turner
 Karen Gillan as Ginny Turner
 Rebecca Reid as Tallulah Turner
 Jack McElhone as Alex Mackenzie
 Susan Vidler as Sarah Jane Mackenzie
 Emma Wilson as Alicia
 Joe Cassidy as Police Detective
 Jon Eriksen as Jeff
 Kimberly Gallacher as Mica
 Zaynah Iyyaz as Bibi

Production
Stacked was created and written by Bryony Ive as her first drama commission. Feeling that there was a lack of drama films for young women, she decided she wanted to write a show for and about that demographic. Following upon surveys she had read which indicated "63% of 15 to 19 year olds claimed that glamour modelling was their ideal profession", she decided to tackle the issue in a drama presentation. She sent her original script treatment to Channel 4's 4Talent Pilot competition, received positive feedback in that her film was not set in a school, and expanded it to include more scenes set in the magazine offices. Channel 4 then set her up with the Brocken Spectre independent production company to film the project. Stacked became the very first drama film to be created through 4Talent Scotland's PILOT scheme.

Reception
Stacked won Channel 4's 4Talent Pilot competition, the reward of which was to be aired on Channel 4.

References

External links
 

British television films
2008 films